3-Aminopentane is the organic compound with the formula (CH3CH2)2CHNH2.  It is a colorless liquid.  It is of interest for producing soluble imides and imines without introducing a chiral center.

Safety
The LD50 (rat, oral or dermal) for primary alkylamines is 100-1 mg/kg.

See also
 1-Aminopentane

References

Alkylamines